Joseph Reed may refer to:

Joseph Reed (playwright) (1723–1787), English playwright and poet
Joseph Reed (politician) (1741–1785), Continental Congressmen, aide-de-camp to George Washington, President of Pennsylvania
Joseph Reed (lawyer) (1772–1846), Pennsylvania Attorney General
Joseph Reed (architect) (c. 1823–1890), Australian architect
Joseph Haythorne Reed (1828–1858), British Member of Parliament
Joseph Rea Reed (1835–1925), U.S. Representative from Iowa
Joseph Verner Reed Jr. (1937–2016), American banker and diplomat

See also
Joe Reed (disambiguation)
Joseph Reid (disambiguation)
Joseph Read (disambiguation)